Daniel  Kaluuya (born 24 February 1989) is a British actor. Prominent both on screen and stage, he has received numerous accolades, including an Academy Award, two BAFTA Awards, and a Golden Globe Award. In 2021, he was named among the 100 most influential people in the world by Time magazine.

Kaluuya began his acting career as a teenager in improvisational theatre. He played Posh Kenneth in the first two seasons of the television series Skins (2007–2009); he also co-wrote some of the episodes. Kaluuya drew praise for his leading performance in Sucker Punch at the Royal Court Theatre in 2010. He went on to gain attention for his television roles in the Doctor Who special episode "Planet of the Dead" (2009), Psychoville (2009–2011), The Fades (2011), and the Black Mirror episode "Fifteen Million Merits" (2011). He also had supporting roles in the films Johnny English Reborn (2011), Kick-Ass 2 (2013), and Sicario (2015).

In 2017, Kaluuya had his breakthrough starring in Jordan Peele's horror film Get Out, which garnered him a nomination for the Academy Award for Best Actor. This was followed by starring roles in Ryan Coogler's superhero film Black Panther (2018), Steve McQueen's crime drama Widows (2018), and Peele's horror film Nope (2022). For his portrayal of Black Panther Party leader Fred Hampton in the biopic Judas and the Black Messiah (2021), he won the BAFTA and Academy Award for Best Supporting Actor.

Early life and education
Kaluuya was born on 24 February 1989 in London to Ugandan parents. His mother raised him on a council estate in Camden Town, along with an older sister. His father lived in Balaka, Malawi and they had no contact until he was 15. Kaluuya attended Torriano Primary School, and St Aloysius' College, Highgate. He subsequently took A-level History, Drama and Biology at Camden School for Girls mixed semi-comprehensive sixth-form college.

Kaluuya wrote his first play at the age of nine, after which he began performing improvisational theatre. He began acting as a child at his local Anna Scher Theatre School and WAC Arts.

Career

2006-2009: Career beginnings and Skins
Kaluuya appeared in his first credited acting role in 2006 as Reece in the BBC's controversial drama Shoot the Messenger. Kaluuya then joined the original cast of Skins as Posh Kenneth; he was also a contributing writer on the first two seasons of the series, as well as the head writer of the episodes titled "Jal" and "Thomas".

After Skins, Kaluuya appeared as a guest star in many popular television series such as Silent Witness, the Doctor Who special "Planet of the Dead", and Lewis. He has also appeared in the sketch show That Mitchell and Webb Look twice and as fan favourite character "Parking Pataweyo" in the sketch show Harry & Paul. Kaluuya also voiced a character in the BBC Radio 4 sitcom Sneakiepeeks. In 2009, he became a regular cast member in the ITV comedy FM. At the end of 2009, the Screen International Magazine picked Kaluuya out in their annual report as a UK Star of Tomorrow.

2010-2018: Stage, Get Out, and Black Panther
In 2010, Kaluuya played the lead role in Roy Williams' Sucker Punch at the Royal Court Theatre in London; Kaluuya won rave reviews for his performance and he won both the Evening Standard Award and Critics' Circle Theatre Award for Outstanding Newcomer. From 2009 to 2011, he portrayed Michael "Tea Leaf" Fry in the dark BBC comedy Psychoville.

Between 2011 and 2013, Kaluuya appeared in several short films, most notably in Daniel Mulloy's Baby, which premiered at the Sundance Film Festival, and went on to win the Best Short Film Award at the Edinburgh International Film Festival, as well as the Best Short Film Award at the British Independent Film Awards. In 2011, he appeared in the sequel to the 2003 film Johnny English, titled Johnny English Reborn, as Agent Tucker. Also in 2011, he played the role of Mac Armstrong in BBC3's supernatural drama series The Fades. In 2013, he appeared in the superhero comedy film Kick Ass 2. In 2015, he portrayed an FBI Agent in Denis Villeneuve's thriller film Sicario.

Kaluuya played one of the lead characters opposite Jessica Brown Findlay in "Fifteen Million Merits", an episode of the anthology series Black Mirror, for which he received positive reviews from critics. The episode originally premiered on Channel 4 in 2011, but gained popularity after it was subsequently released on Netflix in the United States. It was his performance in Black Mirror that attracted the attention of Jordan Peele, who later cast him in Get Out, which proved to be his breakthrough role.

Kaluuya's performance in Get Out, which was released in cinemas on 24 February 2017, attracted significant critical acclaim. Steven Gaydos of Variety wrote that "the terror, tension, humor, and fury of this powerfully effective cinematic balancing act all rests on the shoulders of this brilliant young British actor who communicates universal anxieties without ever losing the essential home address of his beleaguered African-American hero." Richard Lawson of Vanity Fair called Kaluuya's performance a "masterful, telling piece of acting." For his performance, he received numerous accolades, including an Academy Award nomination for Best Actor. He also received nominations for a BAFTA Award, Critics' Choice Award, Golden Globe Award, and SAG Award for his role. In 2018, he received the BAFTA Rising Star Award.

In December 2016, Kaluuya was cast in the Marvel Cinematic Universe film Black Panther. The film was released on 16 February 2018, in the United States. Kaluuya also had a large role in the heist film Widows (2018), and starred in the road trip/crime movie Queen & Slim (2019), opposite Jodie Turner-Smith.

In 2018, he joined the voice cast of the BBC and Netflix's miniseries Watership Down.

2019-present: Nope, Judas and Barney
In October 2019, it was announced that Kaluuya was to produce a feature film based on the children's television show Barney & Friends through his newly formed production company 59%, alongside Mattel Films. According to Kaluuya, the Barney film would "surprise audiences and subvert expectations." As of 2022, the film is still early in development and the script is still being reworked.

In 2020, Kaluuya was announced to produce and star in an adaptation of Femi Fadugba's debut novel The Upper World at Netflix. In 2021, he starred as revolutionary socialist Fred Hampton in the biographical drama Judas and the Black Messiah. His performance in the film was lauded by critics, winning the Academy Award for Best Supporting Actor, BAFTA Award for Best Actor in a Supporting Role, Critics' Choice Movie Award for Best Supporting Actor, Golden Globe Award for Best Supporting Actor – Motion Picture and Screen Actors Guild Award for Outstanding Performance by a Male Actor in a Supporting Role; becoming the only performer that year to win all five major film awards. At age 32, Daniel Kaluuya became the seventh-youngest Academy Award Best Supporting Actor winner.

In early 2021, Kaluuya was cast in Peele’s sci-fi horror Nope, alongside Keke Palmer and Steven Yeun. The film released on July 22, 2022 to positive reviews. Due to scheduling conflicts with Nope, it was announced that Kaluuya will not be reprising his role as W'Kabi in Black Panther sequel, Black Panther: Wakanda Forever. In April, Kaluuya hosted an episode of Saturday Night Live, with musical guest St. Vincent. Kaluuya was also included in Times 2021 list of the 100 most influential people in the world.

In March 2022, it was revealed that Kaluuya was writing a dystopian drama for Netflix, titled The Kitchen, with Kibwe Tavares set to direct. The drama will star Kane Robinson and Jedaiah Bannerman, and is being co-written by Joe Murtagh, and executive-produced by Michael Fassbender.

In May 2022, it was announced that Kaluuya was the narrator for Amazon Prime's sports docuseries All or Nothing: Arsenal, which followed English Premier League side Arsenal behind the scenes throughout their 2021–22 season. In November 2022, Kaluuya was confirmed to portray Hobart "Hobie" Brown / Spider-Punk in Spider-Man: Across the Spider-Verse.

Personal life
Kaluuya lives in West London. He is an ardent supporter of Arsenal F.C., to the extent of referring to Arsenal's North London rivals, Tottenham Hotspur F.C., as the "team who must not be named" and the "Voldemort of the League". August 2022, Kaluuya featured as narrator in All or Nothing: Arsenal, the docuseries about Arsenal's 2021–22 season. He has stated on Jimmy Kimmel Live! that his mother did not understand his success.

Filmography

Film

Television

Theatre

Short film

Awards and nominations

Among Kaluuya's accolades, he has been nominated for two Academy Awards, three British Academy Film Awards, two Golden Globe Awards, a Primetime Emmy Award, four Screen Actors Guild Awards, and a Laurence Olivier Award.

In 2009, at age 20, he was nominated for the Laurence Olivier Award for Outstanding Achievement in an Affiliate Theatre for his performance in Oxford Street. In 2017, he rose to prominence with his breakthrough role in the horror film Get Out (2017), where he starred as Chris, a young black photographer, who uncovers shocking secrets about the family of his white girlfriend. He received critical and commercial success in the role and was nominated for several awards, including the Academy Award for Best Actor, the BAFTA Award for Best Actor in a Leading Role, the Golden Globe Award for Best Actor in a Motion Picture – Musical or Comedy, and two Screen Actors Guild Awards (Outstanding Performance by a Male Actor in a Leading Role and Outstanding Performance by a Cast in a Motion Picture). Alongside his BAFTA nomination for Best Actor in a Leading Role, he won the BAFTA Rising Star Award. The following year, his supporting role in the Marvel Cinematic Universe film Black Panther earned him further praise, and alongside the rest of the film's cast, he won the Screen Actors Guild Award for Outstanding Performance by a Cast in a Motion Picture. In 2021, he continued this momentum with his portrayal of Black Panther Party leader Fred Hampton in the biographical crime drama film Judas and the Black Messiah, for which he received widespread positive reception from critics and won the Academy Award, BAFTA Award, Critics' Choice Movie Award, Golden Globe Award, and the Screen Actors Guild Award for Best Supporting Actor. These achievements made him the only actor to win all five major film acting awards that year (Oscar, BAFTA, Critics' Choice, Golden Globe and SAG), with his Oscar win making him the first British actor of color to win an Oscar for acting (as well as the first British actor of color to be nominated more than once, and the seventh-youngest Best Supporting Actor winner), and BAFTA win making him the first person to receive both the BAFTA Rising Star Award and a major acting award in any category. Winning the SAG Award alongside Chadwick Boseman (lead actor), Viola Davis (lead actress) and Youn Yuh-jung (supporting actress), this marked the first time in the history of the SAG Awards that all four acting winners were people of color.

Outside of film, Kaluuya received recognition for his role guest-hosting a 2021 episode of Saturday Night Live, and he was nominated for the Primetime Emmy Award for Outstanding Guest Actor in a Comedy Series. Also prominent in British theatre, he won the Evening Standard Theatre Award for Outstanding Newcomer for his performance in the premiere production of the Roy Williams play Sucker Punch.

See also
 List of British actors
List of British Academy Award nominees and winners
List of oldest and youngest Academy Award winners and nominees – Youngest winners for Best Actor in a Supporting Role
List of actors with Academy Award nominations
List of actors with two or more Academy Award nominations in acting categories
List of black Academy Award winners and nominees
List of black Golden Globe Award winners and nominees

Notes

References

External links
 

1989 births
Living people
21st-century English male actors
Alumni of the Anna Scher Theatre School
Audiobook narrators
BAFTA Rising Star Award winners
Best Supporting Actor Academy Award winners
Best Supporting Actor BAFTA Award winners
Best Supporting Actor Golden Globe (film) winners
Black British male actors
English male film actors
English male stage actors
English male television actors
English male voice actors
English people of Ugandan descent
Male actors from London
Outstanding Performance by a Cast in a Motion Picture Screen Actors Guild Award winners
Outstanding Performance by a Male Actor in a Supporting Role Screen Actors Guild Award winners
People from Camden Town